Arantxa Sánchez Vicario was the defending champion and won in the final 6–1, 6–4 against Gabriela Sabatini.

Seeds
A champion seed is indicated in bold text while text in italics indicates the round in which that seed was eliminated. The top eight seeds received a bye to the second round.

  Arantxa Sánchez Vicario (champion)
  Conchita Martínez (quarterfinals)
  Martina Navratilova (semifinals)
  Gabriela Sabatini (final)
  Mary Joe Fernández (second round)
  Lindsay Davenport (semifinals)
  Mary Pierce (quarterfinals)
  Magdalena Maleeva (third round)
  Amanda Coetzer (third round)
  Sabine Hack (quarterfinals)
  Brenda Schultz (first round)
  Chanda Rubin (quarterfinals)
  Leila Meskhi (third round)
  Ginger Helgeson (second round)
  Barbara Rittner (first round)
  Meike Babel (second round)

Draw

Finals

Top half

Section 1

Section 2

Bottom half

Section 3

Section 4

External links
 ITF tournament edition details 

Amelia Island Championships
1994 WTA Tour